Fay Grim is a 2006 espionage thriller film written and directed by Hal Hartley. The film is a sequel to Hartley's 1997 film Henry Fool, and revolves around the title character, played by Parker Posey, the sister of Simon Grim (James Urbaniak).  The plot revolves around Fay's attempt to unravel an increasingly violent mystery in Europe.

Hartley began writing the script in 2002, and filming took place in Europe from January to March 2006. It premiered in September at the 2006 Toronto International Film Festival, and received a theatrical release in the United States on May 18, 2007. The film was shot almost entirely in Dutch angles, meaning the vast majority of shots are framed diagonally, or "tilted".  At the 2007 Sundance Film Festival, Hartley revealed that the two shots in the film's final cut that are not "Dutched" occurred when he and the film crew forgot to tilt the camera.

A sequel, Ned Rifle, was released in 2014.

Plot

Seven years after the events of Henry Fool, Fay Grim (Parker Posey) is coerced by a CIA agent (Jeff Goldblum) to try to locate 'the confession novel' notebooks that belonged to her fugitive husband (Thomas Jay Ryan) whom he believes to be deceased. Fay is launched into a world of espionage as she travels to Paris to retrieve some of the journals, each having mysteriously appeared in the hands of the most unlikely of people. Simon Grim, Fay's brother and Nobel Prize–winning poet because of Henry, remains home with his sister's son, the CIA and his publisher.

Even in death it seems Henry is a force of nature causing life changing ructions in the lives of those he has touched. Fay is surrounded by competing agents all vying for her help in retrieving notebooks as she and Simon start getting clues to what the unpublishable nonsense of The Confession is really all about and why the CIA believe they contain information that could compromise U.S. security. A former air-hostess befriends Fay and reveals she was similarly touched by Henry's chaotic influence and aid her in her efforts.

Fay's whirlwind culminates in a tense meeting with a notorious terrorist and friend of Henry where she has to make the biggest decision of her life.

Cast

Parker Posey as Fay Grim
James Urbaniak as Simon Grim
Liam Aiken as Ned Grim
Jeff Goldblum as Agent Fulbright
Megan Gay as Principal
Jasmin Tabatabai as Milla 
Chuck Montgomery as Angus James
Leo Fitzpatrick as Carl Fogg
Saffron Burrows as Juliet
Elina Löwensohn as Bebe
Thomas Jay Ryan as Henry Fool
Anatole Taubman as Jallal
Nikolai Kinski as Amin
John Keogh as Prosecutor
Mehdi Nebbou as Islamic Cleric
Claudia Michelsen as Judge 
David Scheller as Convict Husband
Sibel Kekilli as Concierge Istanbul Hotel
Peter Benedict as Raul Picard

Production
Fay Grim, like its predecessor Henry Fool (1997), was directed, written, co-produced and composed by Hal Hartley. Plans for a Henry Fool sequel went back to 1994, when Hartley made a note to himself that the film would be the first in a series. During production of the first film, Hartley joked about making sequels but had no serious plans to do so. A few years after the release of Henry Fool, Hartley began to reconsider the idea of a sequel. When asked by Hartley in April 2002, Parker Posey said she wanted to reprise her role as Fay Grim, prompting Hartley to begin writing the script that year. Although Posey had a smaller role in the first film, Hartley was impressed with her acting and had always intended for the sequel to focus on her character. Reassembling other returning cast members was easy according to Hartley, as the project had been in discussion for years.

Hartley said that Fay Grim was inspired by current world events and the world around him, particularly after the September 11 attacks and the awareness that it raised about terrorism and espionage. He said he wanted to "pull the characters in this direction – into an international espionage farce – because the world was feeling crazy, mixed-up, and very dangerous". He envisioned Fay as "the representative American of a certain type: well-intentioned but ill-informed. This is a story of her getting tossed into the wider world, and hearing and learning about all the complexity at a political level. And she's sort of being a stand-in for people like me -- as hard as I try to understand everything, I never trust that I have a real good grip on it". Hartley read the 2003 mystery thriller novel The Da Vinci Code twice while writing the script as he "wanted to make good on all the genre expectations".

Fay Grim was produced for $2 million, an increase from the $900,000 budget of its predecessor. Executive producer Ted Hope, a longtime collaborator of Hartley's, contacted his friends Joana Vicente and Jason Kilot to produce the film and finance its budget, which included global travel and stunts. The project was announced during the 2005 Toronto International Film Festival. Filming began in Europe in mid-January 2006, and concluded by the end of March. The primary filming location was Berlin, where Hartley had lived since 2004. A number of locations in Berlin stood in for New York, as filming in the actual state was deemed too expensive. Other filming locations included Paris and Istanbul, with some exterior pick-up shots in New York City. It was the first film that Hartley shot in high definition.

Release
Fay Grim premiered at the 2006 Toronto International Film Festival, and was released in theaters across America on May 18, 2007, with a DVD release the following Tuesday, May 22, in conjunction with Magnolia Pictures' "day-and-date" release strategy.

Reception

Critical reception
On review aggregator website Rotten Tomatoes, the film has an approval rating of 46% based on 90 reviews, and an average rating of 5.4/10. The website's critical consensus reads, "Fay Grim is too concerned with its own farcical premise to present a coherent, involving story." On Metacritic, the film has a weighted average score of 52 out of 100, based on 26 critics, indicating "generally favorable reviews".

Accolades
The film won the "Audience Choice Award" at the RiverRun International Film Festival in 2007.

References

External links

Fay Grim  at Hal Hartley's Website
Fay Grim Production Notes

The Director Interviews: Hal Hartley, Fay Grim  at Filmmaker Magazine

2006 films
American sequel films
American comedy-drama films
Films directed by Hal Hartley
2006 comedy-drama films
English-language German films
American avant-garde and experimental films
German sequel films
German comedy-drama films
Magnolia Pictures films
2000s avant-garde and experimental films
2000s English-language films
2000s American films
2000s German films